The  superyacht Universe was launched by Amels Holland B.V. at its yard in Vlissingen. She was designed by Tim Heywood, and the interior design was created by Winch Design. She has two sister ships, the 2016-built Plvs Vltra and the 2017 built New Secret.

Design
The hull is built out of steel while the superstructure is made out of aluminium with teak laid decks. The yacht is classed by Lloyd's Register and registered in the Cayman Islands.

Performance

See also
 List of motor yachts by length
 List of yachts built by Amels BV

References

2018 ships
Motor yachts
Ships built in Vlissingen